Beautiful Feelings is the ninth studio album (originally to be the fifth) by Australian musician Rick Springfield, recorded by in 1978. At the height of Springfield's popularity, Mercury Records released the album in 1984 with the musical portions re-recorded and without Springfield's involvement. The one track on the album to obtain some recognition was "Bruce", which was previously released and failed to chart in 1980, but charted and peaked at number 27 on the Billboard Hot 100 in 1984. The album reached number 78 on the Billboard Pop Albums chart.

The cover illustration was created by artist Brian Zick.

The original recordings were released in 2007 on the album The Early Sound City Sessions.

Track listing 
All tracks composed by Rick Springfield; except where indicated
"Bruce" - 3:33
"Just One Look" (Doris Payne, Gregory Carroll) - 2:25
"The Solitary One" - 3:26
"Spanish Eyes" - 3:37
"Everybody's Cheating" (Pat Blerk, Trevor Rabin) - 2:52
"Looking for the One" - 2:38
"Cold Feet" - 3:35
"Brand New Feeling" - 2:50
"Beautiful Feelings" - 2:50
"Guenevere" - 3:07

Charts

Personnel 

 Rick Springfield – vocals, guitar
 Dave Siebels – keyboards
 Ronnie "Rocket" Ritchotte – guitar
 Dave Crigger – drums
 Michael Pecanic - bass
Larry Muhoberac - string arrangement on "Guenevere"

References 

Rick Springfield albums
1984 albums
Mercury Records albums